Nicolaus Hermann (21 October 1818 – 4 August 1888) was a Swiss politician and President of the Swiss Council of States (1861/1862).

Further reading

External links 
 
 

1818 births
1888 deaths
People from Obwalden
Swiss Roman Catholics
Members of the Council of States (Switzerland)
Presidents of the Council of States (Switzerland)
Members of the National Council (Switzerland)
Federal Supreme Court of Switzerland judges
19th-century Swiss judges
19th-century Swiss politicians